Apion nigritarse is a species of seed weevils native to Europe.

References

External links
Images representing Apion at BOLD

Brentidae
Beetles described in 1808
Beetles of Europe